Toprak ("soil") is a Turkish name. Notable people with the name include:

 Mehmet Emin Toprak (1974–2002), Turkish film actor
 Ömer Toprak, Turkish footballer
 Pınar Toprak, Turkish composer
 Toprak  Razgatlıoğlu , Turkish World SuperBike (WSBK) motorcycle racer 

Turkish-language surnames